Spanker is an unincorporated community in Montgomery County, in the U.S. state of Ohio.

History
A post office called Spanker was established in 1860, and remained in operation until 1904. The community was named on account of the spanker wagons which were once made here.

References

Unincorporated communities in Montgomery County, Ohio
Unincorporated communities in Ohio